John Esson (November 6, 1800 – March 4, 1860) was a merchant and politician in Nova Scotia. He represented Halifax County in the Nova Scotia House of Assembly from 1851 to 1863 as a Reformer. He was president of the North British Society.

He was born in Aberdeen, Scotland, the son of Charles Esson and Elizabeth White, and came to Halifax around 1823. He learned the grocery trade from his uncle and later set up his own store, going on to establish a wholesale grocery firm. In 1836, he married Harriet Ann Leonard. Esson was president of the Halifax Fire Insurance Company from 1858 to 1863; Esson was chair of the province's public accounts from 1850 to 1860. He died in office in Halifax at the age of 49.

References 
 

1804 births
1863 deaths
Nova Scotia Reformer MLAs
Nova Scotia pre-Confederation MLAs